The 1939 Palestine League was the seventh season of league football in the British Mandate for Palestine.

Due to the Arab Revolt the league was split into regional leagues in Tel Aviv (two tiers), Samaria and South districts, while in Jerusalem, Haifa and Tiberias leagues were played, managed by the British Army. 

Maccabi Tel Aviv won the Tel Aviv regional league on goal average, while Beitar Netanya and Maccabi Rehovot won the Samaria and Southern divisions. Neither of the winning teams is listed as champions in the Israel Football Association.

Tel Aviv regional league

Division I

Division II

Samaria regional league

Southern regional league

References

Palestine League seasons
Palestine
1
Palestine
1